Yusufağa is a village in the Emirdağ District, Afyonkarahisar Province, Turkey. Its population is 64 (2021).

The village was founded in 1901 by Bulgarian emigrants.

References

Villages in Emirdağ District